These are tables of members from Wyoming of the United States Senate and United States House of Representatives.

The current dean of the Wyoming delegation is Senator John Barrasso, having served in the Senate since 2007.

United States Senate

United States House of Representatives 
Current Representative

Delegates from Wyoming Territory

Members from the State of Wyoming

Key

See also

List of United States congressional districts
Wyoming's congressional districts 
Political party strength in Wyoming

References

General

Politics of Wyoming
Wyoming
Congressional delegations